The list of ship commissionings in 1874 includes a chronological list of all ships commissioned in 1874.


References

See also 

1874
 Ship commissionings